Antaine is the Irish name for many people known in the English language as Tony or Anthony. Notable people with this given name include the following:

First name
Antaine Ó Braonáin, Irish name for Anthony "Tony" Brennan (born 1944), Irish Gaelic football selector and player
Antaine Ó Cadhain, Irish name for Anthony "Tony" Coyne (born 1961), Irish hurling manager and player 
Antaine Ó Cathasaigh, Irish name for Anthony Casey (born 1995), Irish Gaelic footballer 
Antaine Ó Ceallaigh, Irish name for Tony Kelly (born 1993), Irish hurler
Antaine Ó Cuinneagáin, Irish name for Anthony Cunningham (born 1965), Irish hurler and hurling manager
Antaine Dáibhis, Irish name for Anthony "Tony" Davis (born 1964), Irish Gaelic football coach, player and former sports broadcaster
Antaine Ó Meachair, Irish name for Anthony Maher (born 1986), Gaelic footballer
Antaine Móinbhíol, Irish name for Anthony "Tony" Mansfield (1939 – 2013), Irish hurler and manager
Antaine Ó Murchú, Irish name for Anthony "Tony" Murphy (4 July 1950 – 13 October 2004) was an Irish Gaelic football player, selector and administrator
Antaine Ó Súilleabháin, Irish name for Anthony O'Sullivan (born 1966), Irish hurler

Surname
Seán Antaine, Irish name for John Redmond "Jack" Anthony (1885 – 1964), Irish hurler

See also

Antoine
Taine (disambiguation)

Notes

Irish masculine given names